The Walkman S Series is a line of portable media players designed and developed by Sony, currently marketed in Japan. The S Series made their debut in the fall of 2006 and later were launched in other regions. Although the first generation of models had generic displays, all next generations of players of the S Series had TFT color displays and supported video playback. They were slightly cheaper than the flagship A Series but had more features than the E Series. The S Series was discontinued outside Japan in 2012 and continues solely in the domestic market.

History
Two previous models of sports-oriented Network Walkman with the S prefix existed in 2001 and 2003: the NW-S4 and the "S2 Sports" NW-S21/S23.

S200
The NW-S200 S2 Sports Walkman released 2006 were cigar shaped and made of aluminium, also featuring a G-Sensor and a pedometer. It is water resistant and came with an armband and sporty headphones. Models were NW-S205 (2 GB), NW-S203 (1 GB), NW-S202 (512 MB).

S700/S600

October 2006 saw the introduction of the NW-S700/600 Series with an "elegant" design, coming in five colors and featuring a 3-line OLED display including album art. It continues the "bottle" style that was previously seen on the A600 and E500/E400 series, but the S700/S600 included numerous proprietary technologies - it was the first with built-in Active noise control technology as well as Clear Audio, Clear Bass, Virtual Phone Technology Acoustic Engine. It blocks surrounding noise with integrating mic in its EX-earphone. This player is one of only a few other DAPs of its time that have a noise cancellation feature at this size. The earphone has a proprietary design specifically made for this player, thus making it impossible to plug into other DAPs, even the ones that come from Sony.

This Walkman has a small OLED screen capable displaying album art and some text information about the song and the player features. Navigation is done with a swiveling switch carried over from some previous small models. The S700 comes in 1 GB (NW-S703), 2 GB (NW-S705), and 4 GB (NW-S706) capacities; some countries sell the 2 GB and 1 GB models only. Selected models with the "F" suffix are also equipped with a Stereo FM Tuner. This was also the first Walkman with the WM-PORT interface connector which would remain a standard for Sony Walkman for years to come.

S710/S610/S510

Future small sized and/or sporty players would only be released under the B Series or W Series. The S Series was changed into a new mid-level video-enabled range starting with the S710/S610/S510 in August 2007. These were released to complement the new A810 series flagship. The S610 has different styling and was marketed $20 cheaper than the A810 released at the same time. These players had a 320 x 240 pixel QVGA LCD display. Just as the A810, the S710/S610 was the joint first to remove ATRAC support and not require SonicStage, apart from domestic Japanese models.

S730/S630
The NWZ-S730 and S630 series was introduced in August 2008 focusing on slimline designs, and for the first time introducing Sony's SensMe technology to a Walkman digital audio player, which analyzes and lets the user play music based on moods. They were noted as the thinnest ever Walkmans at the time, 7.5 mm thick. The main difference between the series are that the S730 adds noise canceling which the S630 lacks. Starting with this generation, all S Series players would have the so-called "Mickey Mouse" look, because of the specific positioning of the main buttons.

S540
The first and only model with built-in speakers was the S540 series, introduced in August 2009. It had a considerably larger (2.4" LCD) screen with a resolution of 320 X 240 pixels. A slightly bigger chassis allows two endowed speakers to be accommodated at either side of the screen. Below the screen, Sony built its trademark circular control pad which has a standard four-way directional button surrounding a central play/pause key. This is flanked by two additional buttons, back (home) and option (power). The S540 series Walkman is made mostly of plastic but has a shiny metallic topcoat, which gives it a sleek look. The SenseMe and Intelligent Shuffle features were not present in this model. The 8GB S544 went on sale for $110 and the 16GB S545 for $130.

S740 and later models

The NW-S740/S640 series was released in late 2009 in Japan and some other territories. As with the previous generation, the S740 includes noise cancellation compared to S640. The size of the 5 button layout has been increased, while the SensMe function does not appear, although a dedicated Podcast folder has been added. Unlike the preceding S730, the physical noise cancellation switch has been removed in the S740 replaced by a setting in the software.

S750 Series was proclaimed by Sony as "super-slim" when introduced in September 2010. It features Clear Bass, Clear Stereo, SensMe, Lyrics Sync, Karaoke Mode and other features inherited from the E450 series. In 2011 the S760 series introduced Bluetooth connectivity and a greater battery life.

Since the NW-S770 series, the S Series has been only sold and marketed for the domestic market.

Specifications and comparison

See also
 Walkman
 Walkman A Series
 Walkman E Series
 Walkman X Series

References

Walkman
Portable media players